The Gawhar Shad Mausoleum, also known as the Tomb of Baysunghur, is an Islamic burial structure located in what is now Herat, Afghanistan. Built in the 15th century, the structure served as a royal tomb for members of the Timurid dynasty and is part of the Musalla Complex.

Description
The mausoleum forms a cruciform shape, with a dome covering the centre. This dome is the most impressive feature of the structure, in that it is actually three domes superimposed over one another: a low inner dome, a bulbous outer cupola and a structural dome between them. The outer cupola is decorated with flowery light blue-green mosaics. The inner dome is adorned with gold leaf, lapis lazuli and other colours which form intricate patterns. The interior of the tomb itself is a square chamber with axial niches.

Due to the widespread habit of tombstones being taken and re-used, it is unknown how many burials there are in the mausoleum. Though some sources claim there were as many as twenty grave markers at one time, at present there are only six. These are oblong shaped and made of matt black stone, with carved floral patterns.

History
The mausoleum was originally constructed to house the remains of Prince Baysunghur, a son of the Timurid ruler Shah Rukh by his chief wife Gawhar Shad. It was commissioned by the latter (for whom it is named) within a madrassah which also bore her name and was completed in 1438. Its location in the Musalla Complex was convenient due to the close vicinity to the royal residence in the Bagh-i Zaghan. As such, over the following years, further members of Baysunghur's family were interred alongside him. These include Gawhar Shad herself and her brother Amir Sufi Tarkhan, her other son Muhammad Juki, Baysunghur's sons Sultan Muhammad and Ala al-Dawla, as well as the latter's son Ibrahim. More distantly related Timurids, Ahmad and Shah Rukh (sons of Abu Sa'id Mirza), were also buried in the mausoleum. Baysunghur's father was briefly interred as well, before later being transferred to the Gur-e-Amir in Samarqand.

By the 20th century, the mausoleum had been extensively damaged, with the cupola in particular being severely deteriorated. Intervention in the 1950s resulted in drastically changing the appearance of the building, with an entirely new eastern façade being built and the hexagonal Mihrab being demolished and replaced with a rectangular one. This, along with later restorations, were of poor quality and used inappropriate materials. In 2014, UNESCO and the Afghanistan government coordinated to attempt to preserve and replicate the tile work on the exterior dome. UNESCO is presently considering the nomination of Herat (in which the mausoleum is specifically mentioned) as a World Heritage Site.

Gallery

See also
Musalla Complex

References

Buildings and structures completed in the 15th century
Timur
Herat
Burial sites of the Timurid dynasty
Cemeteries in Afghanistan
Vandalized works of art
Archaeological sites in Afghanistan
Buildings and structures in Herat